Buğa or Boğa means "bull" in Turkic languages, also transliterated as Bugha, or Buqa (via Arabic script). It may refer to one of the following persons.
Bugha al-Kabir or Bugha the Elder (died 862), prominent Turkish general in the Abbasid Caliphate
Bugha al-Sharabi or Bugha al-Saghir or Bugha the Younger (died 868), prominent Turkish general in the Abbasid Caliphate
Tala Buga, the khan of Golden Horde between 1287 and 1291
Kitbuqa Noyan (Kit-Bugha), a lieutenant and confidant of the Mongol Ilkhan Hulagu
Buqa, a Mongol lord who was instrumental in sweeping Arghun Khan to power as the fourth Il-Khan of Iran in 1284
Buqa Temür, a khan of the Chagatai Khanate (1272?-1282)
Esen Buqa I, a Khan of the Chagatai Khanate (1310-c. 1318)
Esen Buqa II (died 1462), a Khan of Moghulistan from 1429 until his death
Toghtoa Bugha, Tayisung Khan, Emperor Taizong of Northern Yuan
Timurbugha (az-Zahir Timurbugha), a Burji dynasty sultan (1468-1468)
Bugha (gamer), an American streamer and esports player

See also
Buga (disambiguation)